Good-bye My Loneliness may refer to:

 Good-bye My Loneliness (album), the album
 "Good-bye My Loneliness" (song), the song